Rehimena hypostictalis is a species of moth of the family Crambidae described by George Hampson in 1908. It is found in Sri Lanka and Papua New Guinea.

The wingspan of this species is 22-26 mm.

References

Moths described in 1908
Spilomelinae
Moths of Asia
Moths of Oceania